Bumastus is an extinct genus of corynexochid trilobites which existed from the Early Ordovician period to the Late Silurian period. They were distinctive for their highly globular, smooth-surfaced exoskeleton. They possessed well-developed, large compound eyes and were believed to have dwelled in shallow-water sediments in life.

Bumastus fossils have been found in North and South America, Europe, Asia, and Australia. They are classified under the family Styginidae in the order Corynexochida.

Description
The body is oblong-oval, about twice as long as it is wide, It had a strongly convex profile, giving it its distinctive globular appearance.

Like all trilobites, the body is divided into three functional segments known as tagmata (singular: tagma), which in turn are divided into three lobes - the central lobe (axial) and two lateral lobes (pleural). Aside from faint depressions in the thorax, Bumastus is unusual in that the three lobes are barely discernible from each other. The axial lobe of Bumastus is also very broad in comparison to the pleural lobes.

The cephalon (head segment) is very large and strongly convex. The facial sutures (the divisions by which the cephalon splits when the trilobite molts) is opisthoparian, with the suture ending along the hind cephalic margin. The genal angles of the cephalon - the edges where the lateral and rear margins of the cephalon meet - are rounded. The cephalon is effaced (smooth and mostly featureless), an evolutionary trend also seen in Illaenus and Trimerus, though not as pronounced as that of Bumastus. The glabella (the central lobe of the head) is almost fused to the fixigena.

The thorax has ten narrow segments while the pygidium (the tail) is smooth and very rounded. It is isopygous - that is, the pygidium is about the same size as the cephalon. The pygidium completely lacks any visible trilobation. It is usually semicircular in shape but can be pointed in some species like B. niagarensis.

The smooth compound eyes are large and peculiarly well-developed. This, along with the rounded contours of their body, suggests that Bumastus may have spent most of its time buried in sediment with its eyes protruding.

The surface of the exoskeleton of most species is studded with minute punctures.

Paleoecology

The rounded smooth shape of Bumastus, as well as the almost complete effacement of its cephalon, is believed to have been an adaptation for burrowing. The presence of well-developed eyes also suggest that it may have kept them above the substrate by burrowing into sediments backward. They are situated in such a way that they provide the trilobite with a semicircular field of vision on each side, keeping them aware of movements near them.

Bumastus could also curl up (known as enrollment) into a ball-like shape. This is believed to indicate that its habitat might have been the shallow waters of the Littoral zone. When waves wash them out from the sediments it could simply roll up and be carried along. Enrollment protects the softer body parts below the exoskeleton, while the spherical shape offers the least resistance to wave action.

Bumastus is a bottom-dwelling (nektobenthic) trilobite. It was probably either detritivorous, feeding on decomposing organic material drifting down in the currents, or carnivorous.

Occurrence
Bumastus existed during the Paleozoic era, from the Arenigian epoch of the Early Ordovician period to the Ludlow epoch of the Late Silurian period (approximately 478.6 ± 1.7 to 418.7 ± 2.8 million years ago). Their fossils can be found worldwide.

Specimens have been recorded from the Silurian of Argentina, Canada, the Czech Republic, Estonia, Greenland, Kazakhstan, Norway, the Russian Federation, Sweden, Ukraine, the United Kingdom, and the United States.

They can also be found in the Ordovician formations of Australia, Canada, China, the Czech Republic, the Russian Federation, Spain, the United States; with specific occurrences from the Dobrotivian age/stage (Llandeilo age) of China and France, and the Whiterockian stage of the United States.

They are typically found in reef limestone, though they are sometimes found in crinoidal limestone.

Discovery
Bumastus was first described by the Scottish geologist, Sir Roderick Impey Murchison in 1839. The type species, Bumastus barriensis was recovered from the Coalbrookdale Formation of the Wenlock Group in England.

Murchison first believed that the specimens he discovered (including a large  by  specimen) belonged to the genus Isotelus because of the size, shape, and almost featureless cephalon. But he noted the almost absent trilobation of body and the difference in the number of segments in the thorax (10 in B. barriensis and 8 in Isotelus).  He also recognized its close relationship with the genus Illaenus, but ultimately classified it as a new genus based on the extremely advanced state of effacement in the cephalon of Bumastus.

The genus is so named because of its curious resemblance to a large round grape. It comes from Latin būmastus (large grapes that resemble the udders of a cow), which in turn came from Greek βοῦς (bous - cow) and μαστός (mastós - breasts). The word was familiar in the English language during Murchison's time, being a word encountered in book two of Virgil's Georgics.

The specific name of the type species, barriensis, roughly meaning "of Barr", comes from its common name among collectors. It was then known as the "Barr trilobite" referring to the plentiful occurrence of B. barriensis in the limestone formations of Great Barr, Staffordshire.

Taxonomy

Bumastus is classified under the family Styginidae by P.A. Jell and J.M. Adrain in 2003, and under the order Corynexochida of trilobites by Jack Sepkoski in 2002.

Species
Listed below are the species classified under Bumastus and the countries of their recorded type localities. The list is incomplete and may be inaccurate.

Bumastus armatus - United States
Bumastus barriensis - Estonia, Kazakhstan, Ukraine, United Kingdom, United States
Bumastus beckeri - United States
Bumastus bellmanni - Argentina
Bumastus bouchardi - Czech Republic, Ukraine
Bumastus chicagoensis - United States
Bumastus cuniculus - United States
Bumastus cuniculus|Bumastus cuniculus vieillensis - Canada
Bumastus dayi - United States
Bumastus erastusi - Canada
Bumastus globosus - Canada, United States (Synonym (biology)|synonym?:Illaenus globosus)
Bumastus graftonensis - United States
Bumastus hornyi - Czech Republic
Bumastus indeterminatus - Canada
Bumastus insignis - United Kingdom, United States
Bumastus ioxus - United States
Bumastus lenzi - Canada
Bumastus limbatus - United States
Bumastus milleri - United States
Bumastus niagarensis - United States
Bumastus orbicaudatus - Canada, United States
Bumastus phrix - Estonia, Ukraine, United Kingdom
Bumastus springfieldensis - United States
Bumastus sulcatus - Sweden
Bumastus tenuirugosus - Canada
Bumastus tenuis - United States
Bumastus transversalis - United States
Bumastus trentonensis - United States

See also

References

External links

Order Corynexochida from A Guide to the Orders of Trilobites

Styginidae
Corynexochida genera
Silurian trilobites of South America
Ordovician trilobites
Wenlock series fossils
Early Ordovician first appearances
Silurian extinctions
Silurian trilobites of Europe
Silurian trilobites of North America
Silurian trilobites of Asia
Bromide Formation
Paleozoic life of Ontario
Paleozoic life of Nunavut
Paleozoic life of Quebec
Taxa named by Roderick Murchison